Patrycja Królikowska (born 15 May 1992) is a Polish handball player for Vistal Gdynia and the Polish national team.

She participated at the 2016 European Women's Handball Championship.

References

1992 births
Living people
Polish female handball players
Sportspeople from Łódź
21st-century Polish women